Torzeh (also Romanized as Tarzeh; also known as Ţorzeh, Towrzeh, and Tūrzah) is a village in Poshtkuh-e Mugui Rural District, in the Central District of Fereydunshahr County, Isfahan Province, Iran. At the 2006 census, its population was 37, in 9 families.

References 

Populated places in Fereydunshahr County